Shirley Ellen Schwartz or Ellen Shirley Schwartz (Aug. 26, 1935 – May 8, 2016) was a chemist and research scientist at General Motors, specializing in the study and development of industrial lubricants and automobile oil change indicator systems. She was inducted into the Michigan Women's Hall of Fame in 1996 for her accomplishments in the field of chemistry.

Early life and education 
She was born Ellen Shirley Eckwall in Detroit, grew up in the Detroit suburb of Pleasant Ridge, and graduated from Lincoln High School in Ferndale. Schwartz earned three academic degrees in chemistry. She attended the University of Michigan where she received her Bachelor of Science degree in chemistry in 1957. She then enrolled at Wayne State University and earned her master's degree 1962 and her doctorate in 1970.

Career 
After teaching at Oakland Community College and the Detroit Institute of Technology, Schwartz began working at BASF Corporation in Wyandotte, Michigan, where she developed an industrial lubricant that, by virtue of being primarily water, reduced the amount of oil and consequently pollution. She then spent over 18 years working at General Motors, where she was senior research scientist, working in Research and Development Operations at the General Motors Technical Center in Warren, Michigan. During her career she came to hold more than 20 patents, and authored 173 technical papers. From 1989 to 2003 she wrote a regular column titled Love Letters to Lubrication Engineers in the journal of the Society of Tribologists and Lubrication Engineers, and was remembered in a 2016 memorial in that journal as "the mother of the oil life monitor found in most GM cars, which is responsible for not having to change oil nearly as often as we did previously, or conversely, not ruining your engine if you don't change it often enough."

When presenting her with an achievement award in 1999, the Society of Women Engineers summarized Dr. Schwartz's career thusly:

"Dr. Schwartz has examined engine oil degradation; wear, corrosion, and elastomer durability in engines; the effects of methanol and ethanol fuel on engines; and lubricants for air conditioners that use alternative refrigerants (other than Freon R12). Her work in these areas have been targeted towards:
 obtaining the maximum useful life of engine oil
 finding acceptable ways to use alternative energy sources
 developing refrigerant systems that will not hurt the earth's ozone layer"

Awards and honors 
Schwartz was named a fellow of the Society of Automotive Engineers in 1999 and was elected to the National Academy of Engineering in 2000 "for contributions to lubrication engineering and for enriching the technical community through free-lance writing." She additionally received many industry awards:
 General Motors Kettering Award (1988): Awarded for computer-based method that assesses engine oil degradation as a function of oil temperature and displays the remaining life of the oil for the vehicle           
 General Motors McCuen Award (1993)
 Gold Award from the Engineering Society of Detroit (1989)
 Wilbur Deutsch Memorial Award from the Society of Tribologists and Lubrication Engineers (1987)
 Colwell Award (1992) from the Society of Automotive Engineers
 Distinguished Speaker Award (1995) from the Society of Automotive Engineers

Personal life 
She married her husband Ron Schwartz in 1957.

References 

Women materials scientists and engineers
Tribologists
American materials scientists
20th-century American chemists
General Motors people
1935 births
2016 deaths
University of Michigan College of Literature, Science, and the Arts alumni
Wayne State University alumni
Members of the United States National Academy of Engineering
Scientists from Detroit
People from Warren, Michigan
Detroit Institute of Technology
Deaths from dementia in Michigan
Deaths from Alzheimer's disease
People from Pleasant Ridge, Michigan